Lynchburg is an independent city in the Commonwealth of Virginia in the United States. First settled in 1757 by ferry owner John Lynch, the city's population was 79,009 at the 2020 census, making Lynchburg the 11th most populous city in  Virginia. Located in the foothills of the Blue Ridge Mountains along the banks of the James River, Lynchburg is known as the "City of Seven Hills" or the "Hill City". In the 1860s, Lynchburg was the only city in Virginia that was not recaptured by the Union before the end of the American Civil War.

Lynchburg lies at the center of a wider metropolitan area close to the geographic center of Virginia. It is the fifth-largest MSA in Virginia, with a population of 261,593. It is the site of several institutions of higher education, including Virginia University of Lynchburg, Randolph College, University of Lynchburg, Central Virginia Community College and Liberty University. Nearby cities include Roanoke, Charlottesville, and Danville.

History 
Monacan Indian Nation and other Siouan Tutelo-speaking tribes had lived in the area since at least 1270, driving the Virginia Algonquians eastward to the coastal areas. Explorer John Lederer visited one of the Siouan villages (Saponi) in 1670, on the Staunton River at Otter Creek, southwest of the present-day city, as did the Thomas Batts and Robert Fallam expedition in 1671.

Siouan peoples occupied this area until about 1702; they had become weakened because of high mortality from infectious diseases. The Seneca people, who were part of the Haudenosaunee, or Iroquois Confederacy based in New York, defeated them. The Seneca had ranged south while seeking new hunting grounds through the Shenandoah Valley to the West. At the Treaty of Albany in 1718, the Iroquois Five Nations ceded control of their land east of the Blue Ridge Mountains, including Lynchburg, to the Colony of Virginia; they confirmed this in 1721.

Founding and early growth 
First settled by Anglo-Americans in 1757, Lynchburg was named for its founder, John Lynch. When about 17 years old, Lynch started a ferry service at a ford across the James River to carry traffic to and from New London, where his parents had settled. The "City of Seven Hills" quickly developed along the hills surrounding Lynch's Ferry.

In 1786, Virginia's General Assembly recognized Lynchburg, the settlement by Lynch's Ferry on the James River. The James River Company had been incorporated the previous year (and President George Washington was given stock, which he donated to charity) in order to "improve" the river down to Richmond, which was growing and was named as the new Commonwealth's capital. Shallow-draft James River bateau provided a relatively easy means of transportation through Lynchburg down to Richmond and eventually to the Atlantic Ocean. Rocks, downed trees, and flood debris were constant hazards, so their removal became expensive ongoing maintenance. Lynchburg became a tobacco trading, then commercial, and much later an industrial center.

Eventually the state built a canal and towpath along the river to make transportation by the waterway easier, and especially to provide a water route around the falls at Richmond, which prevented through navigation by boat. By 1812, U.S. Chief Justice John Marshall, who lived in Richmond, reported on the navigation difficulties and construction problems on the canal and towpath.

The General Assembly recognized the settlement's growth by incorporating Lynchburg as a town in 1805; it was not incorporated as a city until 1852. In between, Lynch built Lynchburg's first bridge across the James River, a toll structure that replaced his ferry in 1812. A toll turnpike to Salem, Virginia was begun in 1817. Lynch died in 1820 and was buried beside his mother in the graveyard of the South River Friends Meetinghouse. Quakers later abandoned the town because of their opposition to slaveholding. Presbyterians took over the meetinghouse and adapted it as a church. It is now preserved as a historic site.

To avoid the many visitors at Monticello, Thomas Jefferson in 1806 developed a plantation and house near Lynchburg, called Poplar Forest. He often visited the town, noting, "Nothing would give me greater pleasure than to be useful to the town of Lynchburg. I consider it as the most interesting spot in the state." In 1810, Jefferson wrote, "Lynchburg is perhaps the most rising place in the U.S.... It ranks now next to Richmond in importance...."

Early Lynchburg residents were not known for their religious enthusiasm. The established Church of England supposedly built a log church in 1765. In 1804, evangelist Lorenzo Dow wrote: "...where I spoke in the open air in what I conceived to be the seat of Satan's Kingdom. Lynchburg was a deadly place for the worship of God'." That referred to the lack of churches, which was corrected the following year. Itinerant Methodist Francis Asbury visited the town; Methodists built its first church in 1805. Lynchburg hosted the last Virginia Methodist Conference that bishop Asbury attended (February 20, 1815). As Lynchburg grew, prostitution and other "rowdy" activities became part of the urban mix of the river town. They were often ignored, if not accepted, particularly in a downtown area referred to as the "Buzzard's Roost." Methodist preacher and later bishop John Early became one of Lynchburg's civic leaders; unlike early Methodist preachers who had urged abolition of slavery during the Great Awakening; Early was of a later generation that had accommodated to this institution in the slave societies of the South.

On December 3, 1840, the James River and Kanawha Canal from Richmond reached Lynchburg. It was extended as far as Buchanan, Virginia in 1851, but never reached a tributary of the Ohio River as originally planned. Lynchburg's population exceeded 6,000 by 1840, and a water works system was built. Floods in 1842 and 1847 wreaked havoc with the canal and towpath. Both were repaired. Town businessmen began to lobby for a railroad, but Virginia's General Assembly refused to fund such construction. In 1848 civic boosters began selling subscriptions for the Lynchburg and Tennessee Railroad.

By the 1850s, Lynchburg (along with New Bedford, Massachusetts) was among the richest towns per capita in the US. Tobacco (including the manufacture of plug tobacco in factories using rented slave labor), slave-trading, general commerce, and iron and steel manufacturing powered the economy.

Railroads had become the wave of the future. Construction on the new Lynchburg and Tennessee railroad had begun in 1850 and a locomotive tested the track in 1852. A locomotive called the "Lynchburg" blew up in Forest, Virginia (near Poplar Forest) later that year, showing the new technology's dangers. By the Civil War, two more railroads had been built, including the South Side Railroad from Petersburg. It became known as the Atlantic, Mississippi and Ohio Railroad in 1870, then a line in the Norfolk and Western Railway, and last as part of the Norfolk Southern Railway. The Orange and Alexandria Railroad stopped in Lynchburg.

American Civil War 
During the American Civil War, Lynchburg served as a Confederate transportation hub and supply depot. It had 30 hospitals, often placed in churches, hotels, and private homes.

In June 1864, Union forces of General David Hunter approached within  as they drove south from the Shenandoah Valley. Confederate troops under General John McCausland harassed them. Meanwhile, the city's defenders hastily erected breastworks on Amherst Heights. Defenders were led by General John C. Breckinridge, who was an invalid from wounds received at the Battle of Cold Harbor. Union General Philip Sheridan appeared headed for Lynchburg on June 10, as he crossed the Chickahominy River and cut the Virginia Central Railroad. However, Confederate cavalry under General Wade Hampton, including the 2nd Virginia Cavalry from Lynchburg under General Thomas T. Munford, defeated his forces at the two-day Battle of Trevillian Station in Louisa County, and they withdrew. This permitted fast-marching troops under Confederate General Jubal Early to reach within four miles of Lynchburg on June 16 and tear up the tracks of the Orange and Alexandria Railroad to inhibit travel by Union reinforcements, while Confederate reinforcements straggled in from Charlottesville.

On June 18, 1864, in the Battle of Lynchburg, Early's combined forces, though outnumbered, repelled Union General Hunter's troops. Lynchburg's defenders had taken pains to create an impression that the Confederate forces within the city were much larger than they were in fact. For example, a train was continuously run up and down the tracks while drummers played and Lynchburg citizens cheered as if reinforcements were disembarking. Local prostitutes took part in the deception, misleading their Union clients about the large number of Confederate reinforcements. Narcissa Owen (Cherokee), wife of the president of the Lynchburg and Tennessee Railroad, later wrote about her similar deception of Union spies.

From April 6 to 10, 1865, Lynchburg served as the capital of Virginia after the Confederate government fled from Richmond. Governor William Smith and the Commonwealth's executive and legislative branches escaped to Lynchburg as Richmond surrendered on April 3. Lynchburg surrendered on April 12, to Union General Ranald S. Mackenzie.

Ten days later, Confederate Brigadier General James Dearing died. He was a native of nearby Campbell County and descendant of John Lynch; he had been wounded on April 6 at High Bridge during that Appomattox campaign. Mackenzie had visited his wounded friend and former West Point classmate, easing the transition of power.

Post-Civil War recovery 
The railroads that had driven Lynchburg's economy were destroyed by the war's end. The residents of the city deeply resented occupying forces under General J. L. Gregg, and worked more readily with his affable successor General N.M. Curtis. Thomas J. Kirkpatrick became superintendent for the public education established under Virginia's Reconstruction-era legislature and Constitution of 1869, and built four new public schools. Previously, the only education for students from poor families was provided through St. Paul's Episcopal Church.

Floods in 1870 and 1877 destroyed the city's bridges (which were rebuilt) and the James River and Kanahwa Canal (which was not rebuilt). The towpath was used as the bed for laying the rails of the Richmond and Allegheny Railroad, a project conceived five decades earlier.

The city limits expanded in 1874. In 1881 that railroad was completed to Lynchburg, and another railroad reached it through the Shenandoah Valley. Lynchburg had a telegraph, about 15,000 residents, and the beginnings of a streetcar system. Many citizens, believing their city crowded enough, did not join the boosters who wanted Lynchburg to become the junction of that valley line and what became the Norfolk and Western Railroad, so the junction was moved to Big Lick. This later developed as the City of Roanoke.

In the latter 19th century, Lynchburg embraced manufacturing (the city being sometimes referred to as the "Pittsburgh of the South"). On a per capita basis, it became one of the wealthiest cities in the United States. In 1880, Lynchburg resident James Albert Bonsack invented the first cigarette-rolling machine. Shortly thereafter Dr. Charles Browne Fleet, a physician and pharmacological tinkerer, introduced the first micro-enema to be mass marketed over-the-counter. By the city's centennial in 1886, banking activity had increased sixfold over the 1860 level, which some attributed to slavery's demise. The Lynchburg Cotton Mill and Craddock-Terry Shoe Co. (which would become the largest shoe manufacturer in the South) were founded in 1888. The Reusens hydroelectric dam began operating in 1903 and soon delivered more power.

In 1886, Virginia Baptists founded a training school, the Lynchburg Baptist Seminary. It began to offer a college-level program to African-American students in 1900. Now named the Virginia University of Lynchburg, it is the city's oldest institution of higher learning. Not far outside town, Randolph-Macon Woman's College and Sweet Briar College were founded as women's colleges in 1893 and 1901, respectively. In 1903, the Christian Church (Disciples of Christ) founded Lynchburg Christian College (later Lynchburg College) in what had been the Westover Hotel resort, which went bankrupt in the Panic of 1901. During the 2018-19 school year, the college's name was changed to the University of Lynchburg, reflecting its expansion of graduate-level programs and research. Lynchburg's first public library, Jones Memorial Library, opened in 1907.

During World War I, the city's factories supported the war effort, and the area also supplied troops. The city powered through the Roaring Twenties and survived the Great Depression. Its first radio station, WLVA, began in 1930, and its airport opened in 1931. In 1938, the former fairgrounds were redeveloped as side-by-side baseball and football stadiums.

World War II and after 
Lynchburg's factories again worked 24 hours daily during World War II. In 1955, both General Electric and Babcock & Wilcox built high technology factories in the area.

Lynchburg lost its bid to gain access to an interstate highway. In the late 1950s, interested citizens, including Virginia Senator Mosby G. Perrow, Jr., asked the federal government to change its long-planned route for the interstate highway, now known as I-64, between Clifton Forge and Richmond.

Since the 1940s, maps of the federal interstate highway system showed a proposed northern route, bypassing the manufacturing centers at Lynchburg and Roanoke. But federal officials assured Virginia that the state would decide the route. Although initially favoring that northern route, Virginia's State Highway Commission eventually supported a southern route from Richmond via US-360 and US-460, which connected Lynchburg and Roanoke via US-220 from Roanoke to Clifton Forge, then continued west following US-60 into West Virginia. However, in July 1961, Governor J. Lindsay Almond and US Secretary of Commerce Luther Hodges announced that the route would not be changed. Lynchburg was left as the only city with a population in excess of 50,000 (at the time) that was not served by an interstate.

The Virginia State Colony for Epileptics and Feebleminded (now known as the Central Virginia Training School), was established outside Lynchburg in Madison Heights. For several decades throughout the mid-20th century, the state of Virginia authorized compulsory sterilization of the mentally retarded for the purpose of eugenics. The operations were carried out at the institution. An estimated 8,300 Virginians were relocated to Lynchburg and sterilized there, making the city a "dumping ground" of sorts for the feeble-minded, poor, blind, epileptic, and those otherwise seen as genetically "unfit". Carrie Buck challenged the state sterilization, but it was finally upheld by the United States Supreme Court in Buck v. Bell. She was classified as "feeble-minded" and sterilized while a patient at the Virginia State Colony.

Sterilizations were carried out for 35 years until 1972, when the operations were halted. Later in the late 1970s, the American Civil Liberties Union filed a class-action lawsuit against the state of Virginia on behalf of the sterilization victims. In the settlement, victims received formal apologies from the state and counseling if they chose, but the judiciary denied requests for the state to pay for reverse sterilization operations. In 1994, Buck's sterilization and litigation were featured as a television drama, Against Her Will: The Carrie Buck Story. The Manic Street Preachers address the issue in their song "Virginia State Epileptic Colony" on their 2009 album Journal for Plague Lovers.

Modern revitalization 
Liberty University, founded in 1971 as Lynchburg Baptist College and renamed in 1985, is one of the country's largest institutions of higher education and the largest employer in the Lynchburg region. The university states that it generates over $1 billion in economic impact to the Lynchburg area annually.

Lynchburg has ten recognized historic districts, four of them in the downtown residential area. Since 1971, 40 buildings have been individually listed on the National Register of Historic Places.

Downtown Lynchburg has undergone significant revitalization, with hundreds of new loft apartments created through adaptive reuse of historic warehouses and mills. Since 2000, downtown has attracted private investments of more than $110 million, and business activity increased by 205% from 2004 to 2014. In 2014, 75 new apartment units were added to downtown Lynchburg, with 155 further units under construction, increasing the number of housing units downtown by 48% from 2010 to 2014.

In 2015, the $5.8-million Lower Bluffwalk pedestrian street zone opened. Notable projects underway in downtown by the end of 2015 include the $25-million Virginian Hotel restoration project, a $16.6-million restoration of the Academy Center of the Arts, and $4.6-million expansion of Amazement Square Children's Museum.

Timeline 

 1786 – Lynchburg founded.
 1791 – Tobacco warehouse built.
 1798 – South River Friends Meetinghouse built.
 1805 – Town of Lynchburg incorporated.
 1806
 City Cemetery established.
 Construction of Thomas Jefferson's Poplar Forest begins near Lynchburg.
 1830
 Elijah Fletcher becomes mayor.
 Population: 4,630.
 1840
 James River and Kanawha Canal to Richmond opens.
 Population: 6,395.
 1850 – Population: 8,071.
 1852
 Virginia & Tennessee Railroad begins operating.
 City of Lynchburg incorporated.
 Lynchburg Daily Virginian newspaper begins publication.
 1855 – Lynchburg Courthouse built.
 1856 – Methodist Protestant Lynchburg College established.
 1864 – June 17–18: Battle of Lynchburg fought near city during the American Civil War.
 1866 – Southern Memorial Association founded.
 1870 – September: Flood.
 1879 – George D. Witt Shoe Corporation in business.
 1880 – James Albert Bonsack invents cigarette rolling machine.
 1886 – First Baptist Church built.
 1888 – Virginia Theological Seminary founded.
 1893 – Randolph-Macon Woman's College opens.
 1895 – St. Paul's Church built.
 1898 – "Confederate Infantryman" monument erected.
 1900 – Population: 18,891.
 1903 – Virginia Christian College founded.
 1908 – Jones Memorial Library opens.
 1912 – Equal Suffrage League formed.
 1913 – Statue of John Warwick Daniel erected.
 1920 – Little Theater established.
 1928 – Monument Terrace built.
 1930
 WLVA radio begins broadcasting.
 Population: 40,661.
 1932 – Civic Art League founded.
 1940 – City Stadium opens.
 1953 – WLVA-TV (television) begins broadcasting.
 1954 – Carter Glass Memorial Bridge opens.
 1959 – Pittman Plaza shopping centre in business.
 1966
 Lynchburg Public Library opens.
 Central Virginia Community College and Lynchburg Baseball Corporation established.
 1971 – Lynchburg Baptist College (later Liberty University) founded.
 1978 – Point of Honor house museum opens.
 1980 – Population: 66,743.
 1990 – President George H. W. Bush gives commencement speech at Liberty University.
 1993 – Bob Goodlatte becomes U.S. representative for Virginia's 6th congressional district.
 1995 – Lynchburg Hillcats baseball team active.
 2000 – City website online (approximate date).
 2010 – Population: 75,568.
 2016 – Joan Foster becomes mayor.
 2017 – President Donald Trump gives commencement speech at Liberty University.
 2023 - Stephanie Reed becomes mayor.

Geography 

Neighborhoods 
The first neighborhoods of Lynchburg developed upon seven hills adjacent to the original ferry landing. These neighborhoods include:
 Court House Hill (original hill)
 College Hill
 Daniel's Hill
 Diamond Hill (Grace Street, Washington Street)
 Federal Hill
 Franklin Hill
 Garland Hill
 White Rock Hill (Florida Avenue)

Other major neighborhoods, with more upside, include Tinbridge Hill, Boonsboro, Trents Ferry, Rivermont, Fairview Heights (Campbell Ave corridor), Jackson Heights, Federal Hill (Federal Street, Jackson Street, Harrison Street) Fort Hill, Forest Hill (Old Forest Rd. Area), Timberlake, Windsor Hills, Sandusky, Sheffield, Linkhorne, Cornerstone and Wyndhurst.

Climate 
Lynchburg has a four-season humid subtropical climate (Köppen Cfa), with cool winters and hot, humid summers. Nights tend to be significantly cooler than days throughout much of the year due in part to the moderate elevation.

Seven Hills 
One of the most prominent nicknames of Lynchburg is the "City of Seven Hills." This is due to one prominent feature of its geography, the seven hills that are spread throughout the region. They seven hills are: College Hill, Garland Hill, Daniel's Hill, Federal Hill, Diamond Hill, White Rock Hill, and Franklin Hill.

Adjacent counties 
 Amherst County, Virginia – northeast
 Bedford County, Virginia – west, northwest
 Campbell County, Virginia – south, southeast

Demographics

2020 census

Note: the U.S. Census treats Hispanic/Latino as an ethnic category. This table excludes Latinos from the racial categories and assigns them to a separate category. Hispanics/Latinos can be of any race.

2010 Census
As of the 2010 census, there were 75,568 people, 25,477 households, and 31,992 families residing in the city. The population density was 1,321.5 people per square mile (510.2/km2). There were 27,640 housing units at an average density of 559.6 per square mile (216.1/km2). The racial makeup of the city was 63.0% White, 29.3% African American, 0.2% Native American, 2.5% Asian, 0.04% Pacific Islander, 0.63% from other races, and 1.7% from two or more races. Hispanic or Latino of any race were 3.0% of the population.

There were 25,477 households, out of which 27.8% had children under the age of 18 living with them, 41.6% were married couples living together, 16.0% had a female householder with no husband present, and 38.8% were non-families. 32.7% of all households were made up of individuals, and 12.9% had someone living alone who was 65 years of age or older. The average household size was 2.30 and the average family size was 2.92.

The age distribution of the city had: 22.1% under the age of 18, 15.5% from 18 to 24, 25.3% from 25 to 44, 20.8% from 45 to 64, and 16.3% who were 65 years of age or older. The median age was 35 years. For every 100 females, there were 84.2 males. For every 100 females age 18 and over, there were 79.1 males.

The median income for a household in the city was $32,234, and the median income for a family was $40,844. Males had a median income of $31,390 versus $22,431 for females. The per capita income for the city was $18,263. About 12.3% of families and 15.9% of the population were below the poverty line, including 22.4% of those under age 18 and 10.7% of those age 65 or over.

Lynchburg ranks below the 2006 median annual household income for the U.S. as a whole, which was $48,200, according to the US Census Bureau.

In 2009, almost 27% of Lynchburg children lived in poverty. The state average that year was 14%.

Economy 

Of Virginia's larger metro areas, Forbes Magazine ranked Lynchburg the 5th best place in Virginia for business in 2006, with Virginia being the best state in the country for business. In the same survey, Lynchburg achieved the rank of 109th in the nation.

Industries within the Lynchburg MSA include nuclear technology, pharmaceuticals, and material handling. A diversity of small businesses with the region has helped maintain a stable economy and has minimized the impacts of nation-wide economic downturns.

Government  

Lynchburg uses a council-manager system. The Lynchburg City Council is composed of seven members that each serve a four-year term. There are four wards that elect a member; the remaining three are elected in at-large elections in which the top three candidates obtain a seat. The City Council is also responsible for appointing a city manager, city attorney, and city clerk.

The current council members are:
MaryJane Dolan (Mayor) (Ward I)
Beau Wright (Vice Mayor) (at-large)
Sterling Wilder (Ward II)
Jeff Helgeson (Ward III)
Chris Faraldi (Ward IV)
Randy Nelson (at-large)
Treney Tweedy (at-large)

 John Wiatt, 1806
 Roderick Taliaferro, 1807
 Samuel J. Harrison, 1808
 John Lynch, Jr., 1809
 M. Lambert, 1810
 John Schoolfield, 1811
 James Stewart, 1812
 Robert Morris, 1813
 Samuel J. Harrison, 1814
 James Stewart, 1815
 John M. Gordon, 1816
 Samuel J. Harrison, 1817
 William Morgan, 1818
 James Stewart, 1819
 John Thurman, 1820
 Micajah Davis, 1821
 John Hancock, 1822
 Thomas A. Holcombe, 1823
 Albon McDaniel, 1824
 John Victor, 1825
 Albon McDaniel, 1826
 Christopher Winfree, 1827
 Albon McDaniel, 1828
 Ammon Hancock, 1829
 Elijah Fletcher, 1830
 John R. D. Payne, 1831
 Elijah Fletcher, 1833
 John M. Warwick, 1833
 Henry M. Didlake, 1834
 Samuel J. Wiatt, 1835
 Pleasant Labby, 1836
 Ammon Hancock, 1837
 Martin W. Davenport, 1838
 John R. D. Payne, 1839
 Samuel Nowlin, 1840
 Ammon Hancock, 1841
 Henry M. Didlake, 1842
 Edwin Mathews, 1843
 David W. Burton, 1844
 M. Hart, 1845
 Henry M. Didlake, 1846
 Daniel J. Warwick, 1847
 Henry 0 Schoolfield, 1848
 Edwin Mathews, 1849
 Henry M. Didlake, 1850
 William D. Branch, 1851
 Albon McDaniel, 1869
 James M. Cobbs, 1870
 George H. Burch, 1872
 Samuel A. Bailey, 1876
 Samuel Griffin Wingfield, 1880
 A. H. Pettigrew, 1882
 Nathaniel Clayton Manson, Jr., 1884–1891
 Robert D. Yancey, circa 1900
 Royston Jester, Jr., circa 1918
 ?
 L. E. Litchford, circa 1937
 Clarence G. Burton, 1946–1948
 Jerome V. Morrison, circa 1952
 John L. Suttenfield, circa 1953–1956
 ?
 Elliott Shearer, circa 1982
 Jimmie Bryan, circa 1986
 ?
 M.W. "Teedy" Thornhill Jr., 1991–1992
 James S. Whitaker, 1994–1998
 Carl B. Hutcherson, Jr., circa 2002–2005
 Michael Gillette, circa 2015
 Joan Foster, 2016–2018
 Treney Tweedy, 2018–2020 
 MaryJane Dolan, 2020–2022 
 Stephanie Reed, 2023-Present

Education

Colleges and universities

Public schools 
 Central Virginia Community College

Private schools 

 Liberty University
 University of Lynchburg
 Randolph College
 Virginia University of Lynchburg
 American National University (one of several campuses)
 Sweet Briar College (located in nearby Sweet Briar, Virginia)

Primary and secondary schools

Public schools 

The city is served by the Lynchburg City Public Schools. The school board is appointed by the Lynchburg City Council.
 E. C. Glass High School – 2111 Memorial Ave
 Heritage High School – 3020 Wards Ferry Rd
 Linkhorne Middle School – 2525 Linkhorne Dr
 Paul Laurence Dunbar Middle School – 1208 Polk St
 Sandusky Middle School – 805 Chinook Place
 William Marvin Bass Elementary School
 Bedford Hills Elementary School
 Dearington Elementary School for Innovation
 Heritage Elementary School
 Linkhorne Elementary School
 Paul M. Munro Elementary School
 Perrymont Elementary School
 Robert S. Payne Elementary School
 Sandusky Elementary School
 Sheffield Elementary School
 Thomas C. Miller Elementary School for Innovation

Lynchburg is also home to the Central Virginia Governor's School for Science and Technology located in Heritage High School. This magnet school consists of juniors and seniors selected from each of the Lynchburg-area high schools. As one of eighteen Governor's Schools in Virginia, the Central Virginia Governor's School focuses on infusing technology into both the math and science curriculum.

Private schools 
The city is also home to a number of religious and non-religious private schools, including Appomattox Christian Academy, Desmond T Doss Christian Academy, James River Day School, Liberty Christian Academy, New Covenant Classical Christian School, Temple Christian School, Virginia Episcopal School, and New Vistas School.

Health care 
 Centra Lynchburg General Hospital – Lynchburg, VA
 Centra Virginia Baptist Hospital – Lynchburg, VA
 Community Health Center – Lynchburg, VA

Transportation

Local transit 
The Greater Lynchburg Transit Company (GLTC) operates the local public transport bus service within the city. The GLTC additionally provides the shuttle bus service on the Liberty University campus.

The GLTC selected a property directly across from Lynchburg-Kemper Street Station as its top choice of sites upon which to build the new transfer center for their network of public buses. They were interested in facilitating intermodal connections between GLTC buses and the intercity bus and rail services which operate from that location. The project was completed and opened to the public on June 16, 2014.

On August 23, 2017, the GLTC launched The Hopper, a free downtown circulator bus with a $479,348 grant from the Virginia Smart Scale program. On June 29, 2019, the GLTC ended service for The Hopper due to "consistently low ridership" and the expiration of a $117,820 state grant that covered operating costs.

Intercity transit 
Intercity passenger rail and bus services are based out of Kemper Street Station, a historic, three-story train station recently restored and converted by the city of Lynchburg to serve as an intermodal hub for the community. The station is located at 825 Kemper Street.

Bus 
Greyhound Lines located their bus terminal in the main floor of Kemper Street Station following its 2002 restoration. Greyhound offers transport to other cities throughout Virginia, the U.S., Canada, and Mexico.

Rail 
Amtrak's long distance Crescent and a Northeast Regional connect Lynchburg with Boston, New York, Philadelphia, Baltimore, Washington, Charlotte, Atlanta, Birmingham, New Orleans and intermediate points.

In October 2009, Lynchburg became the southern terminus for a Northeast Regional that previously had overnighted in Washington. The forecast ridership was 51,000 for the 180-mile extension's first year, but the actual count was triple that estimate, and the train paid for itself without any subsidy. By FY 2015, the Regional had 190,000 riders. The Lynchburg station alone served a total of 85,000 riders in 2015. It is located in the track level ground floor of Kemper Street Station.

Lynchburg has two major freight railroads. It is the crossroads of two Norfolk Southern lines. One is the former mainline of the Southern Railway, upon which Kemper Street Station is situated. NS has a classification yard located next to the shopping mall. Various yard jobs can be seen. Railfans who wish to visit the NS Lynchburg yard are advised to inquire with an NS official. CSX Transportation also has a line through the city and a small yard.

Air 
Lynchburg Regional Airport is solely served by American Eagle to Charlotte, North Carolina. American Eagle, a subsidiary of American Airlines, is the only current scheduled airline service provider, with seven daily arrivals and departures to Charlotte Douglas International Airport. In recent years air travel has increased, with 157,517 passengers flying in and out of the airport in 2012, representing 78% of the total aircraft load factor for that time period.

Highway 
Primary roadways include U.S. Route 29, U.S. Route 501, U.S. Route 221, running north–south, and U.S. Highway 460 (Richmond Highway), running east–west. While Lynchburg is the largest city in Virginia not served by an interstate, parts of Route 29 have been upgraded to interstate standards and significant improvements have been made to Highway 460 in the immediate vicinity to Lynchburg and suburban areas.

Arts and culture 
In a Forbes magazine survey, Lynchburg ranked 189 for cultural and leisure out of 200 cities surveyed.
 Lynchburg Symphony Orchestra. Created in 1983, throughout the years a variety of music has been presented, from the classical to the patriotic to the popular.
 Academy of Fine Arts. Greater Lynchburg’s center for arts, culture, and community building. 
 Commerce Street Theater.
 Renaissance Theater. The longest-running community theater in the area, open for over 25 years.
 Lynchburg Art Club. Formed in March 1895.
 Opera on the James. Opera performed by national and regional artists in a wide variety of venues since 2005 including classic grand operas, small scale lesser-known operas, contemporary works, family operas, concerts of diverse repertoire, lectures, school tours and free community outreach.
 The Maier Museum of Art. The museum is located on the campus of Randolph College and features works by American artists of the 19th and 20th centuries.
 Riverviews Artspace. A nonprofit arts organization presenting contemporary art exhibitions, multi-disciplinary programs, and events.

Attractions and entertainment 
The following attractions are located within the Lynchburg MSA:
 Amazement Square: Central Virginia's first multidisciplinary, hands-on children's museum.
 Appomattox Courthouse: The site of the Battle of Appomattox Court House, where the surrender of the Confederate Army under Robert E. Lee to Union commander Ulysses S. Grant took place on April 9, 1865, effectively ending the American Civil War.
 Crabtree Falls: The longest waterfall east of the Mississippi River, is located in Nelson County, Virginia. The trail leads hikers along a 1.7-mile hike with views of five cascades of Crabtree Falls. The land formerly in private ownership prior to the late 1970s is in the George Washington National Forest. Crabtree Falls sits near two undeveloped mountainous areas designated as Wilderness areas: The Priest & Three Ridges respectfully. Since 1982, thirty (30) people have fallen to their deaths due to navigating too far away from the trail. There are warning signs at the public trailhead because of this.
 James River Heritage Trail: Composed of two smaller trails, the Blackwater Creek Bikeway and RiverWalk.
 Trails of Blackwater Creek: a network of paved and unpaved trails weaving through the Blackwater Creek natural area.
 Miller-Claytor House: Pre-19th century townhouse where Thomas Jefferson allegedly proved to the owner of the house's garden that tomatoes were not poisonous by eating one of the fruit. Home was dismantled in 1936 and rebuilt at its Riverside Park location, where the garden was also restored.
 National D-Day Memorial: Located in Bedford, Virginia, it commemorates all those who served the United States during the D-Day Invasion of Normandy, France on June 6, 1944 during World War II.
 Nature Zone: A division of Lynchburg Parks and Recreation.
 Old City Cemetery Museums & Arboretum: The most visited historic site in the City of Lynchburg. Established in 1806, the Old City Cemetery is Lynchburg's only publicly owned burial ground and one of its oldest cemeteries. It is also home to the largest public collection of heirloom or "antique" roses in the Commonwealth of Virginia.
 The Old Court House: This Hill City landmark was built in 1855. Fashioned as a Greek temple high above the James River, it is now the home of Central Virginia's best collection of memorabilia, furnishings, costumes and industrial history.
 Peaks of Otter: Three mountain peaks in the Blue Ridge Mountains, overlooking the town of Bedford, Virginia and in prominent view throughout most of Lynchburg.
 Point of Honor: The Federal-era mansion of Dr. George Cabell, Sr., friend and physician of the patriot Patrick Henry, and John S. Langhorne whose daughter Elizabeth Langhorne Lewis led the fight for women's suffrage. His granddaughters include Mrs. Charles Dana Gibson, the original "Gibson Girl" and Nancy Langhorne, Lady Astor, the first woman elected to the British Parliament.
 Poplar Forest: Thomas Jefferson's retreat home. Jefferson designed the octagonal house during his second term as president and sojourned here in his retirement to find rest and leisure and escape public life. Ongoing restoration and archaeology is taking place at the site. A future access road/parkway is planned between the property and the Wyndhurst community with an existing signalized intersection on Enterprise Drive.
 Smith Mountain Lake: The largest lake entirely within Virginia, located in Bedford County, Virginia and Franklin County, Virginia (part of the Lynchburg MSA), the man-made lake features about 20,000 surface acres and 500 miles of shoreline.

Sports and recreation 

Lynchburg is home to sporting events and organizations including:
 Blackwater Rugby Club: a local Men's Division III rugby club, part of the Capitol Rugby Union of USA Rugby.
 7 Hills Hash House Harriers: The local chapter of an international group of non-competitive running, social and drinking clubs.
 Hiking areas include the Appalachian Trail, Peaks of Otter, Apple Orchard Falls Trail, Blackwater Creek Natural Area, Liberty Mountain Trail System, Crabtree Falls, Holliday Lake, Mount Pleasant National Scenic Holliday Lake, and Otter Creek Trail.
 Liberty Flames: An NCAA Division I department of athletics competing in 20 sports. They are a member of the ASUN Conference.
 University of Lynchburg: The Hornets are an NCAA Division III school competing in 13 sports, as a member of the Old Dominion Athletic Conference (ODAC).
 Lynchburg Hillcats: A Class Low-A professional baseball team in the Low-A East. They are affiliated with the Cleveland Guardians of the American League.
 Liberty Mountain SnowFlex Centre: A synthetic ski slope featuring Snowflex, located near Liberty University. It includes beginner, intermediate and advanced slopes for year-round skiing, snowboarding, and inner-tubing. It is the first of its kind in the United States.

Notable people

 Daniel Weisiger Adams (1820–1872), noted lawyer and Confederate Army officer
 Lynn Bari, (1913-1989), American actress
 Beth Behrs (born 1985), actress
 Ota Benga (c. 1883–1916), Congolese native who was exhibited in human zoos
 James Albert Bonsack (1859–1924), invented in 1880 the first cigarette-rolling machine
 Connie Britton (born 1967), actress
 Julie Story Byerley (born 1970), pediatrician and vice dean for education for the University of North Carolina at Chapel Hill School of Medicine
 George Cabell, Sr. (1766–1823), physician
 Desmond Doss (1919–2006), Medal of Honor recipient for actions during World War II, dramatized in Hacksaw Ridge
 Arthur Earley (1926–1981), Pennsylvania state representative
 Jubal Early (1816–1894), lawyer and Confederate general
 Jerry Falwell (1933–2007), pastor and founder of Moral Majority
and his sons, Jerry Falwell Jr. (born 1962) and Jonathan Falwell (born 1966)
 Charles Browne Fleet (1843–1916), pharmacist and inventor of the micro-enema
 Vinny Giles (born 1943), golfer, U.S. Amateur, British Amateur and Walker Cup champion
 Daniel Hudson (born 1987), MLB player for the Los Angeles Dodgers
 Brandon Inge (born 1977) MLB player, 2001–2013, 12 years for the Detroit Tigers, American League All Star 2009 
 Rosa Kinckle Jones (1858–1932), African-American music teacher 
 Sacha Killeya-Jones (born 1998), professional basketball player
 Luke Jordan (1892–1952), blues guitarist and vocalist
 Randy Lanier (born 1954), professional race-car driver and convicted drug trafficker
 Leland D. Melvin (born 1964), engineer and NASA astronaut; named in 2010 as NASA's associate administrator for education
 Matt Mills (born 1996), NASCAR driver for B. J. McLeod Motorsports
 Rosalie Slaughter Morton (1876–1968), physician and surgeon
 Lucius Shepard (1943-2014), science fiction and fantasy writer
 William Smith (1797–1887), U.S. congressman, twice governor of Virginia, Confederate major general
 Anne Spencer (1882–1975), Harlem Renaissance poet and civil rights activist who revived and hosted the Lynchburg chapter of the NAACP from her home.
 Skeet Ulrich (born 1970), actor whose works include Scream, Riverdale and The Craft
 Phil Vassar (born 1964), country singer
 Bransford Vawter (1815–1838), Virginia's first poet
 Charles Vess (born 1951), fantasy and comics artist
 Walter Browne Woodson (1881-1948), rear admiral, Judge Advocate General of the Navy

Media

Print 
 The News & Advance, Lynchburg's daily newspaper that serves the Central Virginia region, owned by Berkshire Hathaway.
 Lynchburg Living, bi-monthly periodical
 The Lynchburg Guide, quarterly resource directory
 The Burg, weekly entertainment newspaper published by The News & Advance
 Lynch's Ferry, a biannual journal of local history
 Liberty Champion, Liberty University student newspaper
 "The Bulletin", small monthly newspaper

Television 
Lynchburg shares a television and radio market with Roanoke.

 WSET-TV, ABC affiliate based in Lynchburg
 WSLS-TV, NBC affiliate based in Roanoke
 WDBJ, CBS affiliate based in Roanoke
 WBRA-TV, PBS affiliate based in Roanoke
 WFXR, Fox affiliate based in Roanoke
 WWCW, CW affiliate based in Lynchburg, which was previously WJPR
 WPXR-TV, ION affiliate based in Roanoke
 WZBJ, an MyNetworkTV affiliate (formerly UPN & independent) based in Roanoke, though licensed to Danville
 WZBJ-CD, satellite of WZBJ

Radio 
 WJJX 102.7, Urban Contemporary based in Lynchburg
 WLNI 105.9, Talk Radio based in Lynchburg
 WIQO-FM 100.9, Part of the Virginia Talk Radio Network based in Forest
 WLEQ 106.9, BOB-FM, Good Times, Great Oldies, Home of Rock'n'Roll's Great Hits, Lynchburg
 WNRN (WNRS 89.9), Modern Rock based in Charlottesville
 WROV 96.3, Classic Rock based in Roanoke
 WKHF 93.7, Hot AC based in Lynchburg
 WRMV 94.5, Southern Gospel based in Madison Heights
 WRVL 88.3, The Journey, Top 40 CCM Christian Radio based in Lynchburg
 WRXT 90.3, Contemporary Christian Radio based in Lynchburg, part of the "Spirit FM" (WPAR) network of Contemporary Christian stations
 W227BG 93.3 ESPN Sports translator of 106.3 Gretna – Translator at Timberlake – Low power
 WSLC 94.9, Country based in Roanoke
 WSLQ 99.1, Adult Contemporary based in Roanoke
 WSNZ 102.7, Adult Contemporary based in Roanoke
 WHTU 103.9, Oldies based in Lynchburg
 WVBE 100.1, Urban Contemporary based in Lynchburg
 WVTF 89.1, Public Radio based in Blacksburg
 W208AP 89.5 Radio IQ – BBC News/NPR talk translator of 89.9 WWVT-FM Ferrum – Translator at Candlers Mountain – Low power
 WWEM 91.7, Classical Music simulcast of WWED-FM in Spotsylvania/Fredericksburg
 WWMC 90.9, Christian CHR/Rock radio based at Liberty University
 WWZW 96.7, Hot AC based in Buena Vista
 WXLK 92.3, Top-40 Radio based in Roanoke
 WYYD 107.9, Country based in Lynchburg
 WZZI/WZZU 101.5, Roanoke/ 97.9, Lynchburg, Classic/Modern Rock based in Lynchburg
 WAMV 1420, Southern Gospel based in Madison Heights
 WBRG 1050, Talk/ Sports based in Lynchburg also simulcast on 104.5
 WKPA 1390, Religious based in Lynchburg
 WLLL 930, Gospel Music based in Lynchburg
 WLVA 580, (silent), based in Lynchburg
 WVGM 1320, ESPN Sports based in Lynchburg
 WKDE-FM 105.5, Classic & Modern Country based in Altavista
 WGVY 1000 AM, Talk Radio based in Altavista
 WAWX 101.7 FM, Contemporary Christian Radio in Lynchburg, VA.  AIR 1 RADIO. </ref> https://tunein.com/radio/Air1-Radio-1017-s29872/

Sister cities 
  Glauchau, Saxony, Germany
  Rueil-Malmaison, Île-de-France, France

Politics  

Lynchburg has traditionally been a conservative stronghold. This predates the influence of Liberty University; it was one of the first areas of the state where the old-line Byrd Democrats began splitting their tickets at the national level. However, conservative Democrats continued to hold most local offices well into the 1970s.

However, the Democratic Party has seen a gradual increase in popularity in the city since the 1990s, and Lynchburg's political atmosphere has become increasingly moderate. In the 2020 United States presidential election, a plurality of voters in Lynchburg voted for Democratic challenger Joe Biden over Republican incumbent Donald Trump. Biden was the first Democrat to carry Lynchburg since Harry S. Truman in 1948.

See also 

 List of cities in Virginia
 National Register of Historic Places listings in Lynchburg, Virginia

Notes

References

Bibliography 

 
 
 
 
 
 
 
 
 
 
 
 
 
 
 
 James M. Elson. Lynchburg, Virginia: the First Two Hundred Years 1786–1986. Lynchburg: Warwick House Publishers, 2004.

External links 

Government
 

Other
 
 Lynchburg History, old photos of Lynchburg
 Lynchburg Online
 The News & Advance, Lynchburg's daily newspaper
 
 
 Items related to Lynchburg, Virginia, various dates (via Digital Public Library of America)
 Lynchburg Glass Company - glass insulators

 
1786 establishments in Virginia
Cities in Virginia
Populated places established in 1786
Populated places on the James River (Virginia)
Southwest Virginia
Western Virginia